Abdus Salam Tarafdar is a Bangladesh Awami League politician and the former Member of Parliament of Mymensingh-7.

Career
Tarafdar was elected to parliament from Mymensingh-7 as a Bangladesh Awami League candidate in 1986.

References

Awami League politicians
Living people
3rd Jatiya Sangsad members
Year of birth missing (living people)